Jean-Luc Brassard (born August 24, 1972) is a Canadian freestyle skier, winning the gold medal at the 1994 Winter Olympics.  Brassard has been credited with popularizing the wearing of bright knee pads to show off absorption and leg position for mogul skiers to best show judges how smoothly the athlete is taking the turns. He was born in Salaberry-de-Valleyfield, Quebec. In his other Olympic appearances, Brassard placed 7th in 1992, 4th in 1998 and 21st in 2002.

In 2005 he became the spokesman of Le Massif.

In 2012, Brassard was inducted into the Canadian Olympic Hall of Fame.

Brassard served as an assistant chef de mission for Canada at the 2014 Winter Olympics.

In late 2014, the Canadian Olympic Committee (COC) appointed Brassard as chef de mission for Canada at the 2016 Summer Olympics. In October 2015, following the resignation of COC President Marcel Aubut over multiple allegations of sexual harassment of staff, Brassard became vocal about the COC's failure to properly examine the issue when allegations were made in 2008. In April 2016, Brassard resigned as chef de mission, later replaced by Curt Harnett.

Brassard is currently a radio commentator and also the narrator of the French version of the television documentary program How It's Made.

References

External links 
 

1972 births
Canadian male freestyle skiers
Living people
Sportspeople from Salaberry-de-Valleyfield
Olympic medalists in freestyle skiing
Sportspeople from Quebec
Medalists at the 1994 Winter Olympics
Olympic gold medalists for Canada
Freestyle skiers at the 1992 Winter Olympics
Freestyle skiers at the 1994 Winter Olympics
Freestyle skiers at the 1998 Winter Olympics
Freestyle skiers at the 2002 Winter Olympics